Lexington Sporting Club is an American professional soccer team based in Lexington, Kentucky. Founded in 2021, the team will play its inaugural season in 2023. The team will compete in USL League One, in the third division of the United States soccer league system, and play its initial home matches at Toyota Stadium at Georgetown College in Georgetown, Kentucky.

History
On October 5, 2021, the United Soccer League announced that Tower Hill Sports had been granted a USL League One expansion team in Lexington, to start play in the 2023 season. Tentatively named "Lexington Pro Soccer," the team revealed its official colors, crest, and branding as Lexington Sporting Club on March 22, 2022.

Colors and crest 
The Lexington SC crest was designed by Christopher Payne, an award-winning designer whose work with soccer clubs in the United Kingdom and the United States includes Eastleigh Football Club, Flower City Union, Monterey Bay FC, and Appalachian FC. Payne coordinated with Lexington-based media and PR company Bullhorn Creative which oversaw project management, creative services, and messaging beyond the brand design.

Over the course of several months Lexington SC leadership held fourteen listening sessions with community members, gathering more than 300 responses to brand surveys and more than 1,500 responses to stadium surveys to identify key themes to reflect in the club's brand identity. Themes which emerged included the cultural landscape of the Bluegrass region and its lush green rolling hills and leafy woodlands, its equine and bourbon industries, and a communal sense of place. 
 
Surrounded by over 400 horse farms, Lexington is often referred to as the "Horse Capital of the World". It was also the first city outside of Europe to ever host the World Equestrian Games. To reflect this heritage, as well as club ownership's involvement in the thoroughbred industry and President Vince Gabbert's professional connection to Keeneland Race Course, the crest features a vibrant green stylized horse figure set against a dark green background.

Payne developed a typeface called Lex Type specific for Lexington SC branding. He states, "Like a horse, Lex Type is tall, powerful, and athletic. However, if you look closely, you’ll notice the typeface has subtle curves at the top and the bottom of the letters. This detail is inspired by the graceful curves of a bourbon barrel, tying the typography to this important element of local history and tradition."

Stadium 
Lexington SC will play its inaugural season in Toyota Stadium at Georgetown College.

The team's ownership group has proposed a soccer-specific stadium in downtown Lexington. Unfortunately that proposal was denied by LFUCG. The stadium will now be built off Athens Rd just off the 104 I75 Exit with a capacity of approximately 6,000+ seats, as their permanent home, with 2024 as the goal for opening.

Proposed stadium

Originally, the team had plans for a downtown stadium as a part of the Lexington Center Corporation's High Street Development Project. The stadium's design was being directed by architecture firm Gensler. The firm is perhaps best known for designing Shanghai Tower, currently the world's third-tallest building by height. The firm is also responsible for designing several other sporting-specific stadiums and entertainment facilities including Milwaukee Bucks Entertainment Blocks (Milwaukee Bucks), the Banc of California Stadium (Los Angeles Football Club), Q2 Stadium (Austin FC), and BMO Field, Canada's first soccer-specific stadium (Toronto Football Club).
The proposed location for the facility was in the heart of downtown, directly across the street from Central Bank Center and Rupp Arena, a multi-purpose venue which hosts the UK Wildcats men's basketball team, concerts, conventions, and shows. The team has since withdrawn this proposal and that site will be used for mixed use development instead. Plans for a new stadium site are finalized now in a separate location.

Academy
On the same day the club revealed its branding, Lexington SC also announced that two local youth soccer clubs, Lexington F.C. and Commonwealth Soccer Club, would merge to form Lexington SC Academy. In April 2022, Lexington SC announced that it will join the Girls Academy League to add a girls’ youth program in Fall 2022. The following week, the club announced its participation in the USL Academy as part of its pathway-to-pro development model for youth. Their teams play in leagues like Kentucky Premier League (KPL), Kentucky Select Soccer League (KSSL), Great Lakes Conference (GLC), Girls Academy (GA), and more.

Players and staff

Current roster

Staff

Team records

Head coaches

References

External links

Soccer clubs in Kentucky
Sports in Lexington, Kentucky
USL League One teams
2021 establishments in Kentucky
Association football clubs established in 2021
Lexington SC